Sagraea is a genus of flowering plants belonging to the family Melastomataceae. It is now listed as a synonym of Miconia 

Its native range is the Caribbean.

The genus name of Sagraea was in honour of Ramón de la Sagra (1798–1871), a Spanish anarchist, politician, writer, and botanist who founded the world's first anarchist journal, El Porvenir (which is Spanish for "The Future"). 
It was first described and published in Prodr. Vol.3 on page 170 in 1828.

Formerly known species
According to Kew:
Sagraea abbottii 
Sagraea barahonensis 
Sagraea capillaris 
Sagraea fuertesii 
Sagraea gracilis 
Sagraea oligantha 
Sagraea penninervis 
Sagraea polystachya

References

Melastomataceae
Melastomataceae genera